Lidia Vianu (born 7 July 1947 in Bucharest) is a Romanian academic, writer, and translator. She is a professor in the English department of the University of Bucharest, a writer of fiction and poetry, and a translator both from English into Romanian, and from Romanian into English.

Biography 
Her mother, Beatrice Vianu (born Steiner), was an editor, and her father, Theodor Vianu, was a doctor. She attended both high school (1961–1965) and university (1965–1970) in Bucharest. She graduated from the department of English at the University of Bucharest. She defended her doctoral dissertation in 1978, with a thesis titled Philosophical Lyricism in the works of T.S. Eliot and Paul Valéry. After the fall of communism, she was granted two Fulbright Scholarships, and taught in the United States, at State University of New York – Binghamton (1991–1992) and University of California, Berkeley (1997–1998). She became a professor in the University of Department English department in 1998.

Vianu learned English from Leon Levițchi, Dan Duțescu, and C. George Sandulescu. She published English with a Key, a handbook that aims to teach English to Romanians through translation.

Vianu founded the Centre for the Translation and Interpretation of the Contemporary Text at the University of Bucharest.

Work 
As an academic, Vianu is the author of numerous essays, anthologies, interviews, and books of literary criticism. Most of them were written in English, while some were also published in Romanian. Her major subjects in English Studies are T.S. Eliot (T.S. Eliot, An Author for All Seasons), James Joyce, and contemporary British poets and novelists.

As a writer, she published Censorship in Romania (selection, interviews, translations) at Central European University Press, a novel, and three volumes of poetry.

She has published English translations of Eugen Simion's The Return of the Author, Marin Sorescu'sThe Bridge, Mircea Dinescu's The Barbarians’ Return (with Adam Sorkin), 's The Book of Winter and Other Poems, Mircea Ivănescu's Lines poems poetry, and 's No Way Out of Hadesburg and Other Poems.

She also published a large number of translated books in Romania.
Vianu and Sorkin's translation of Marin Sorescu's The Bridge (Bloodaxe Books, 2004), was awarded the Prize of Poetry Society, London, 2005.

Selected works

Literary criticism 
 Scenarii lirice moderne (De la T.S. Eliot la Paul Valéry), Ed. Universității București, 1983
 T. S. Eliot: An Author for All Seasons, Bucharest: Ed. Paideia, 1997
 Censorship in Romania, Central European University Press, 1998
 British Literary Desperadoes at the Turn of the Millennium, Bucharest: Ed. ALL, 1999
 Alan Brownjohn and the Desperado Age, Ed. Universității București, 2003
 The Desperado Age: British Literature at the Start of the Third Millennium, Ed. Universității București, 2004
 Desperado Essay-Interviews, Ed. Universității București, 2006

Translations 
 Joseph Conrad: Oglinda mării, Timișoara: Ed. Amarcord, 1994
 Eugen Simion: The Return of the Author, translated into English for Northwestern University Press, Evanston, IL, 1996 (Nominated for the Scaglione Translation Prize, 1997)
 Marin Sorescu: The Bridge, co-translated with Adam J. Sorkin for Bloodaxe Books, 2004
 Mircea Ivănescu, Lines Poems Poetry, University of Plymouth Press, 2009, co-translated with Adam J. Sorkin
 Ioan Es Pop, No Way Out of Hadesburg and Other Poems, University of Plymouth Press, 2010, co-translated with Adam J. Sorkin
 Ion Mureșan, The Book of Winter and Other Poems, University of Plymouth Press, 2011, co-translated with Adam J. Sorkin
 Hilary Elfick: A Single Instinct. Unicul instinct. Bucharest: Ed. Integral 2017
 Anne Stewart. Let It Come to Us All. Să vină pentru noi toți. Bucharest: Ed. Integral 2017
 Mircea Dinescu, The Barbarians' Return, Bloodaxe Books, 2018

Handbooks of English 
 English with a Key, Timișoara: Ed. de Vest, 1993
 Student la engleză, Bucharest: Ed. Integral, 2016
 Admiterea la engleză, Bucharest: Ed. Integral, 2016
 Admiterea la engleză, Bucharest: Ed. Integral, 2016
 Metoda Lidia Vianu. Smile and Learn! Învățați inteligent. Învățați gramatica, în 7 volume, Bucharest: Contemporary Literature Press, 2021, 7 vols., https://editura.mttlc.ro/metoda-lidia-vianu-7-volume.html

Fiction 
 Prizonieră în oglindă, Galați: Ed. Porto Franco, 1993
 © Bumble--Bea. A tiny book about a huge heart : [in English and Romanian], [2022], https://editura.mttlc.ro/vianu-bumble-bea.html
 Prizonieră în oglindă. Roman. Ediție revizuită, [2022], https://editura.mttlc.ro/vianu-prizoniera-roman.html

Poetry 
 1, 2, 3, Bucharest: Ed. Integral, 1997
 Moderato 7, Editura Orient-Occident, 1998
 Foarte, Bucharest: Ed. Cartea Românească, 2001
 The Wall, Bucharest: Ed. Integral, 2016<ref>[https://editura.mttlc.ro/vianu-the-wall.html Lidia Vianu, The Wall"], mttlc.ro. Retrieved 18 November 2019</ref>
 1, 2, 3. Poeme. Ediție revizuită, Bucharest: Contemporary Literature Press, 2022, https://editura.mttlc.ro/vianu-123-poeme.html
 Foarte. Poeme. Ediție revizuită, Bucharest: Contemporary Literature Press, 2022, https://editura.mttlc.ro/vianu-foarte-2022.html
 The Wind and the Seagull. Vântul și Pescărușul. La Mouette et le Vent..., Bucharest: Contemporary Literature Press, 2022, https://editura.mttlc.ro/vianu-the-wind-and-the-seagull.html
 Vântul și Pescărușul / The Wind and the Seagull / La Mouette et le Vent, București: Editura EIKON, 2022, https://www.librariaeikon.ro/poezie/1346-vantul-si-pescarusul.html

 References 

 External links 
 Lidia Vianu, interview in The Massachusetts Review''

1947 births
Living people
Academic staff of the University of Bucharest
University of Bucharest alumni
English–Romanian translators
20th-century Romanian poets
20th-century translators
20th-century Romanian women writers
Romanian women poets
James Joyce scholars